Tai is a given name.  People with the name include:

People with the given name
Tai Babilonia (born 1959), American figure skater
Tai Collins (born 1962), American model and actress
Tai Enosa (born 1989), American Samoan rugby player
Tai Geng (died 1667 BC), Chinese king
Tai Situ Changchub Gyaltsen (1302–1364), Tibetan politician
Tai Hara (born 1990), Australian actor
Tai Jia (died 1720 BC), Chinese prince
Tai Kang, Chinese ruler
Tai Kato (1916–1985), Japanese film director and screenwriter
Tai Sing Loo (1886–1971), American photographer
Tai McIsaac (born 1975), Australian football coach
Tai Murray (born 1981/82), American violinist
Tai Nguyen (born 1975), Australian film and television actor
Tai Odiase (born 1995), American basketball player
Tai Orathai (born Orathai Dabkham, 1980), Thai singer
Tai Pichit (born Chuchart Trairatanapradit, 1949), Thai snooker player
Tai Shani (born 1976), British artist
Tai Si, Chinese wife of King Wen
Tai Situpa (born 1954), Tibetan lama
Tai Solarin (1922–1994), Nigerian educator
Tai Streets (born 1977), American football player
Tai Telin, wife of a nobleman in the Maratha princely state of Aundh (present-day India)
Tai Tuisamoa (born 1980), American rugby union player
Tai Tuivasa (born 1993), Australian mixed martial arts fighter
Tai Tura (born 1949), Cook Islands politician
Tai Webster (born 1995), New Zealand basketball player
Tai Wesley (born 1996), American basketball player
Tai Woffinden (born 1990), British speedway racer
Tai Tsun Wu (born 1933), American physicist
Tai Wynyard (born 1998), New Zealand basketball player

See also
Tai (disambiguation)
Tai (surname)